David Graham Rushbury (born 20 February 1956) is an English former football player and manager. Rushbury made over 400 Football League appearances for eight different clubs.

Early playing career
Rushbury began his career at West Bromwich Albion, making his debut in 2–2 home draw with Millwall on 26 October 1974. In all he managed 26 league appearances in his first season, most in at centre-back. However the return to full fitness of Ally Robertson restricted Rushbury to only two league outings the following season. As a consequence he moved to Sheffield Wednesday for £60,000 in 1976 and made over 100 league appearances at the club.

Promotion
In 1979, he moved to Swansea City for £60,000. Whilst at the Vetch Field Rushbury played in the historic team that won promotion to the top-flight for the first time in the club's history in the 1980-81 season. He then joined Carlisle United in a £40,000 deal in August 1981 and once again played in a promotion winning team for the Cumbrians. He would go on to appear in nearly 130 league games for the Brunton Park club.

Later playing career
Rushbury left Carlisle in 1985 and had a brief spell at Gillingham. Then in July 1985 he signed for Doncaster Rovers in a £10,000 deal, linking up with manager Dave Cusack who had been a teammate at Wednesday. One of the most experienced members of the squad, Rushbury became a vital part of the Rovers team over the next two seasons.

Approaching veteran stage, Rushbury left Doncaster in 1987 and finished his league career with brief spells at Bristol Rovers and Cambridge United. He finished his playing days with a spell in non-league football with Goole Town.

Management
Following the departure of Nicky Law to Bradford City physiotherapist Rushbury, who also holds a UEFA 'A' licence, was appointed manager of Chesterfield, initially as caretaker. Rushbury's caretaker spell proved a success, earning him the job full-time. However the club struggled under Rushbury's leadership and he quit in April 2003, citing abuse from the club's supporters as the main reason behind his decision.

Following his departure from Saltergate Rushbury served as director of football at non-league Alfreton Town for a time.

References

1956 births
Living people
English footballers
West Bromwich Albion F.C. players
Sheffield Wednesday F.C. players
Swansea City A.F.C. players
Carlisle United F.C. players
Gillingham F.C. players
Doncaster Rovers F.C. players
Bristol Rovers F.C. players
Cambridge United F.C. players
Goole Town F.C. players
English football managers
Chesterfield F.C. managers
Matlock Town F.C. managers
Association football physiotherapists
Association football defenders